The Hauraki Mavericks are a New Zealand based field hockey club, originating in the nation's central region. The club was established in 2020, and is one of four established to compete in Hockey New Zealand's new premier domestic competition, the Premier Hockey League.

The club unifies both men and women under one name.

The Hauraki Mavericks competed for the first time in the inaugural season of Premier Hockey League, where both the men's and women's teams finished in third place in their respective tournaments.

History
Along with three other teams, the Hauraki Mavericks were founded in 2020 as part of Hockey New Zealand's development of hockey. 

The team unifies the region from Auckland to Taupo. The team garner their name from a maverick; a person who thinks independently, and "never, ever gives up."

Teams

Men
The following players represented the men's team during the 2020 edition of the Sentinel Homes Premier Hockey League.

Leon Hayward (GK)
Taylor Craigie (GK)
Jared Panchia
Aidan Sarikaya
Jacob Soo-Choon
Maks Wyndham-Smith
Matthew Rees-Gibbs
Timothy Neild
Malcolm Curley
Marcus Child
Arun Panchia
Cameron Hayde
Garrick du Toit
Jonathan Keaney
Nic Woods
Zander Fraser
Simon Child
Shae Iswar
Campbell MacLean
Daniel Panchia
Oliver MacIntyre
Dwayne Rowsell

Women
The following players represented the women's team during the 2020 edition of the Sentinel Homes Premier Hockey League.

Alice McIlroy-Foster (GK)
Grace O'Hanlon (GK)
Louisa Tuilotolava
Elizabeth Thompson
Alison Hunt
Julia King
Maddison Dowe
Tayla White
Alia Jaques
Eva Zylstra
Kendra Peart-Anderson
Kimberley Tanner
Sophie Morrison
Lydia Woods
Amelia Marlow
Tarryn Davey
[[Rose Keddell]]
<li value=18>Alex Lukin
<li value=19>[[Amy Robinson (field hockey)|Amy Robinson]] 
<li value=20>Tori Robinson
<li value=21>Breana Catley
{{div col end}}

References
{{reflist}}

External links
[https://blacksticksnz.co.nz/wp-content/uploads/2020/10/TheMavericks.pdf Hauraki Mavericks]

[[Category:New Zealand field hockey clubs]]
[[Category:Women's field hockey teams in New Zealand]]
[[Category:Sports clubs in New Zealand]]
[[Category:Sports clubs established in 2020]]
[[Category:2020 establishments in New Zealand]]

{{Fieldhockey-team-stub}}